Network filter may refer to:

 Firewall (computing), especially a packet filter, to control inbound and outbound network traffic at the device or local-area-network level
 A computer and network surveillance device or software, of a variety of types
 An Internet filter, software (or firmware) that performs content control and blockage
 A filter (signal processing) of any of several types, as used on a network line or to adjust a wireless network signal, to improve signal quality by removing "noise" (interference)
 A line conditioner of any of several types, as used on a network line, especially:
 Attenuator (electronics), an electronic device that reduces the amplitude of an electronic signal, as used on an Ethernet or other electrical network line
 Optical attenuator, an electronic device that reduces the amplitude of an optical signal, as used on a fiberoptic network line